ADA is a zwitterionic organic chemical buffering agent; one of Good's buffers. It has a useful pH range of 6.0-7.2 in the physiological range, making it useful for cell culture work. It has a pKa of 6.6 with ΔpKa/°C of -0.011 and is most often prepared in 1 M NaOH where it has a solubility of 160 mg/mL.

ADA has been used in protein-free media for chicken embryo fibroblasts, as a chelating agent for H+, Ca2+, and Mg2+, and for isoelectric focusing in immobilized pH gradients. Its effects on dog kidney Na+/K+-ATPase and rat brain GABA receptors have also been studied. ADA does, however, alter coloring in bicinchoninic acid assays.

References

Zwitterions
Amines
Tricarboxylic acids
Buffer solutions